Alberto Ramírez Dioses (born November 5, 1968) is a Peruvian manager and retired footballer who played as a striker.

Playing career

Club
Ramírez started his senior career with Huacho based club Juventud La Palma. He played most of his career in Peru, with notable teams such as Sport Boys, Sporting Cristal, Universitario de Deportes, FBC Melgar, and Juan Aurich. Outside of his home country, Alberto played in Bolivia with The Strongest and in Mexico with Tampico Madero and Puebla. He has also played in the Second Division in Spain with Xerez CD, where he played 11 matches and scored one goal.

International
He played for the Peru national team for a brief period, scoring 3 goals in 11 matches.

Managerial career
He started managerial career with Second Division side Club Atlético Torino in the 2009 Peruvian Segunda División season.

References

External links

1968 births
Living people
People from Talara
Association football forwards
Peruvian footballers
Peru international footballers
Sport Boys footballers
The Strongest players
Alianza Atlético footballers
Sporting Cristal footballers
Deportivo Sipesa footballers
Club Universitario de Deportes footballers
Tampico Madero F.C. footballers
Club Puebla players
Xerez CD footballers
FBC Melgar footballers
C.D. Universidad Privada Antenor Orrego footballers
Juan Aurich footballers
Peruvian expatriate footballers
Expatriate footballers in Bolivia
Expatriate footballers in Mexico
Expatriate footballers in Spain
Peruvian expatriate sportspeople in Bolivia
Peruvian expatriate sportspeople in Mexico
Peruvian expatriate sportspeople in Spain
Peruvian Primera División players
Peruvian football managers